Dacrycarpus expansus is a species of conifer in the family Podocarpaceae. It is found only in Papua New Guinea.

References

expansus
Least concern plants
Taxonomy articles created by Polbot
Taxa named by David John de Laubenfels